Pachypanchax sakaramyi is a species of Aplocheilid killifish endemic to Madagascar where it is only known from Sakaramy and Antongombato Rivers with reports that it is found in several crater lakes.  Its natural habitats are rivers and freshwater lakes. It is threatened by habitat loss and invasive species.

References

Sources
 Loiselle, P. 2006. A review of the Malagasy Pachypanchax (Teleostei: Cyprinodontiformes, Aplocheilidae), with descriptions of four new species. Zootaxa 1366: 1–44 (2006)
 

sakaramyi
Freshwater fish of Madagascar
Taxonomy articles created by Polbot
Fish described in 1928